Tom George Kolath better known as Tom George, is a film producer, director, actor and scriptwriter in the Malayalam Film Industry. He first came to attention for his performance in mini-screen Anna television serial (based on Tolstoy's Anna Karenina) directed by Alagappan. Akale, a film produced by him won the National Film Award and the Kerala State Film Award for best Malayalam feature film.

Film career
Tom George Kolath started his film career in 2004 as the producer of the Malayalam feature film Akale, directed by  Shyamaprasad and won 6 Kerala State Film Awards and 2 National Film Awards including the award for the best feature film in malayalam. Akale was selected at film festivals around the world including 'Fukuoka Focus-on-Asia International Festival' in Japan, 'Foyle International Film Festival' in Northern Ireland, 'River To River Festival' in Florence, Italy, 'Indo-German International Film Festival' in Bangalore, IFFK in Kerala, and Tehran International Film Festival. Akale and Meerayude Dukhavum Muthuvinte Swapnavum are the feature films he produced. He has also directed and co-written (yet to be released) Hollywood movie GandhiPark. He had also acted in few Malayalam feature films like Black, Finger Print and Out of Syllabus.

Filmography

Meerayude Dukhavum Muthuvinte Swapnavum - Producer
Akale - Producer, Actor
Black -  Malayalam Feature film - Actor
Finger Print -  Actor
Out of Syllabus - Actor
Gandhi Park -  Hollywood movie - Director, Co-writer
 Ullurukkam  - Tele film - Actor
 Lessons - Tele Film - Director, Writer
 Anna - TV Serial - Actor, Producer
 Summer in America - Actor
 Folklore (video game) ("FolksSoul: Ushinawareta denshou") – Voice 
 Casualty - Actor
 India Gate - Actor

Music videos

 En Jeevane – Director and Actor - 2005
 Dance With My Father – Director - 2006
 Nee EnnArike – Direction and Lyrics - 2009
 Manoharam – Lyrics and Actor - 2009
 Athirillatha Sneham – Actor - 2008 
 Kumaran Asan's Chandala-bikshuki – Actor - 2008

Commercials

 Coral Group - 2008
 Casadel Fauno Resorts - 2009
 Keltron USA, Ltd - 2010

References

External links
 

Malayalam film producers
Male actors in Malayalam cinema
Indian male film actors
Kerala State Film Award winners
Year of birth missing (living people)
Living people
21st-century Indian male actors
21st-century Indian film directors
Film producers from Kerala
Malayalam film directors
Film directors from Kerala